The 1996 Auto Trader RAC British Touring Car Championship season marked the arrival of Audi to the sport with their four wheel drive A4s. The title was won by Frank Biela, with Swiss driver Alain Menu again finishing in second place and Swede Rickard Rydell in third.

Season review

After seeing the success that rivals BMW and Alfa Romeo had achieved in the series, and wanting to expand their successful touring car programme, Audi entered a works team for the season, headed up by Audi Sport UK's Frank Biela. Biela had won multiple touring car championships and the 1995 Touring Car World Cup for the Four Rings. The Audi A4 proved the class of the field from the get go, helped considerably by its four wheel drive system. This led to an argument between the manufacturers throughout the season, and a weight penalty was added to the Audis. It did not help much; Biela dominated the season and won the title with 4 races to run, one of 7 titles won by the Audi A4 Quattro in 1996. Joining Biela at Audi was rookie John Bintcliffe, winner of the 1995 Ford Fiesta championship and the 1994 Renault Clio Cup. The Yorkshireman would finish seventh in the standings.

Williams Renault were seen as the team to beat before the start of the year after a strong finish to 1995, with Alain Menu title favourite. Early season reliability issues meant that the Swiss driver was never really in title contention but a strong second half of the year allowed him to take runners up spot for the third year in a row. Team mate Will Hoy endured a tough season despite starting strongly, finishing 2nd to Biela in the opening two rounds. He would visit the podium just once more on his way to 9th overall and the following season would move to the Ford team.

Volvo, run by Tom Walkinshaw Racing, developed the 850 further, allowing Rickard Rydell to challenge for wins throughout the year and the Swede was Biela's closest challenger for most of the season. His new team-mate Kelvin Burt, switching from Ford, took a single victory at Silverstone in May. During the following round at Oulton Park he was involved in a vicious accident, knocking him unconscious and having to be cut free from the car. He was taken to Chester Hospital suffering from severe concussion. Burt would miss the next round at Snetterton and was due to be replaced by British Formula 3 driver Jamie Davies, however Davies crashed the car heavily in testing, destroying it and also suffering a concussion, but was otherwise unharmed. As a result Volvo entered just one car for Rydell and Burt would return at the following meeting.

Vauxhall retained their title winning driver line up of John Cleland and James Thompson driving the new Vectra. The new car had a difficult development and was not as mechanically suited to racing as the Cavalier was. Thompson took the team's only win of the season, while Cleland would only finish 8th in the driver's championship.

Ford switched from Andy Rouse to West Surrey Racing to run the Mondeo in cooperation with race car engineering specialist Reynard and Schubel Engineering who built the Mondeo for the equivalent Super Tourenwagen Cup in Germany.  The season was a complete disaster with the car proving to be off the pace and unreliable. Paul Radisich suffered 13 retirements in 24 races while his new team-mate Steve Robertson scored just two points all season.

Honda continued their promise of 1995 despite a slow start David Leslie took three wins during the second half of the season, including the British Grand Prix support race. He was once again joined by James Kaye, although he was unable to match Leslie’s results.

After a disappointing 1995, BMW factory outfit Team Schnitzer returned to the series with 1993 champion Joachim Winkelhock and multiple touring car title winner Roberto Ravaglia leading the team, with Peter Kox running in a third car in selected races. Winkelhock took several wins during the year but was too inconsistent to challenge his compatriot for the title, whilst Ravaglia only won a single race and was mostly remembered for a string contentious moments with the likes of Radisich and Menu during the season.

Total Team Peugeot entered the new 406 model, but Tim Harvey and Patrick Watts struggled for pace and suffered poor reliability throughout the season.

Having been dropped by Ford, Andy Rouse ran a semi-works Nissan team, running Primeras for Gary Ayles and Owen McAuley, but results were limited. McAuley left the team after the British GP support rounds when it became clear the team were only going to get one new 1996-spec car and that would be driven by his team-mate. The team entered just one car thereafter until the final round at Brands Hatch where Jamie Spence drove the 1995 spec car.

In the Total Cup for Independents 1995 Renault Clio Cup champion Lee Brookes entered a 1995 TOM's built Toyota Carina and would secure the title in his debut season beating Richard Kaye's Mint Motorsport Vauxhall, the last RML built Cavalier. The combination was fastest of the non-works teams and Yorkshire-man won the class 16 times but lost out to Brookes on consistency.

Having lost out in their bid to win the Ford works deal Team Dynamics developed their own Ford Mondeos for Matt Neal and Robb Gravett. Success was limited with Neal finishing a distant 3rd in class. He later described the car as the worst he's ever driven and kissed the ground after the final round as he'd never have to drive the car again.

Ian Heward entered selected rounds in an ageing Vauxhall Cavalier  but the car lacked competitiveness and was a long way from the pace of the other independent runners.

Entry List

BTCC

 Rouse Sport were neither a works nor an independent entry.
 Jamie Davies would have stood in for Kelvin Burt at Round 6 (Snetterton) but was sidelined by a testing accident prior to the event.

RAC Tourist Trophy

Manufacturers Championship

Teams Championship

References

External links 
 BTCC Pages
 Touring-Cars.net

British Touring Car Championship seasons
Touring Car Championship